Girish Thakurlal Nanavati (17 February 1935 – 18 December 2021) was an Indian judge who was a Justice of the Supreme Court of India. After his retirement, he headed two commissions inquiring into the 1984 Anti-Sikh riots and the Godhra riots.

Early life
Born in Jambusar, Gujarat, on 17 February 1935, Nanavati was the eldest of twelve children. In his family, his father, grandfather and uncle were all lawyers. Judge Nanavati studied at St. Xaviers College in Mumbai. After finishing his education in the arts, he enrolled in the Government Law College in Mumbai to receive his bachelor's and master's degrees in law.

Career
Nanavati enrolled as an advocate in the Bombay High Court in 1958. Circumstances forced him to return to Gujarat from Mumbai when the bifurcation of the Bombay state in 1960 left him a hard choice. His wish to practice at the prestigious Bombay High Court went unfulfilled and left for Ahmedabad.

His practice in Ahmedabad was very low key. He dealt with a smattering of revenue cases, but his true potential was realized when he began to practice criminal cases. He received and accepted an offer to become a public prosecutor in 1964, which became a turning point in the young man's career. At that time, high court judges, not the government, appointed prosecutors. This began a fifteen-year stint prosecuting cases before the high court.

He was appointed a permanent judge to the Gujarat High Court in 1979. Fourteen years later he was transferred to the high court in Orissa. A year later, in 1994, he was appointed chief justice of the High Court of Orissa. He was transferred again eight months later to the Karnataka High Court. In March 1995 he was appointed a judge to the Supreme Court of India by the Congress government. Judge Nanavati retired on 16 February 2000.

Nanavati Commission
Nanavati was appointed by the National Democratic Alliance government to probe the 1984 Anti-Sikh riots. He was the sole member of the Nanavati commission. The commission incriminated Indian National Congress politicians Sajjan Kumar and Jagdish Tytler. Nanavati has stated that evidence indicated that it was a "lapse on  part of the civil administration" not to call the Indian Army in a timely fashion, "resulting in large-scale rioting and loss of lives".

Godhra riots

In March 2002, Judge Nanavati was appointed to head a two-man commission investigating the 2002 Godhra riots, replacing Judge K. G. Shah. Throughout the proceedings and in its final report of November 2014, the commission concluded that there had been no serious lapses by either the police, or the state administration in dealing with the riots. The report itself has yet to be made public.

Personal life and death
Nanavati died from cardiac arrest on 18 December 2021, at the age of 86 at his home in Ahmedabad.

References

1935 births
2021 deaths
Hindu law jurists
Justices of the Supreme Court of India
Gujarati people
Chief Justices of the Karnataka High Court
20th-century Indian judges
People from Bharuch district
Judges of the Orissa High Court
Judges of the Gujarat High Court
Chief Justices of the Orissa High Court